Susan Elizabeth "Susie" Wynne (born March 6, 1965 in Syracuse, New York) is an American former ice dancer and current figure skating analyst and commentator. She competed at the 1988 Winter Olympics with Joseph Druar. The duo won the gold medal at the U.S. Figure Skating Championships twice. She later competed with Russ Witherby. Since retiring from skating, she has worked as a television figure skating analyst for the Fox and ABC networks.

She has also worked as a coach. She coached Ben Agosto early in his career.

Wynne grew up in Camillus, NY.

Results

With Druar

With Witherby

References

Bibliography
 A Basic Guide to Figure Skating, United States Olympic Committee, 2002

Navigation

Sportspeople from Syracuse, New York
American female ice dancers
American sports announcers
Figure skating commentators
Olympic figure skaters of the United States
Figure skaters at the 1988 Winter Olympics
1965 births
Living people
Goodwill Games medalists in figure skating
Competitors at the 1990 Goodwill Games
21st-century American women